Greatest Hits is the second compilation album released by the British-Norwegian boyband A1. Released on 2 February 2009, following band-member Ben Adams' appearance on Celebrity Big Brother, the album was a commercial failure, following poor promotion and very low sales.

Critical reception
AllMusic reviewer Jon O'Brien gave the album 3.5 stars out of 5, stating: "One of the last British boy bands to make an impact on the charts, the four-piece A1 scored two chart-toppers, a Brit Award, and three Top 20 albums in their short three-year career. Released to coincide with Ben Adams' appearance on Celebrity Big Brother, this belated Greatest Hits collection reveals that seven years after their split, the majority of their ten Top 20 singles have aged better than you'd expect. From their debut album, Here We Come, lead single "Be the First to Believe" is an infectious disco anthem packed with about three different choruses and "Summertime of Our Lives" is a Gallic house-inspired number that's as uplifting as its title suggests, while "Everytime" is an epic string-laden ballad that showcases the band's rather impressive songwriting skills. Unfortunately, "Like a Rose" is so wet that it makes Westlife look like Nine Inch Nails, while "Ready or Not" is sugar-coated Motown that's just a little too sickly sweet. From their most successful period with The A List album, their two number ones suffer contrasting fortunes. Their cover of a-ha's "Take On Me" sounded woefully dated on its release, and sounds even cheaper nine years later, but "Same Old Brand New You" is a glorious dance-pop stomper that recalls the Backstreet Boys at their finest. On their final album, Make It Good, out went the brightly colored tank tops and unashamedly pure pop, and in came the musical instruments and a more mature acoustic sound. This attempt to be taken more seriously worked wonders for them on the brilliant "Caught in the Middle" but sounded contrived on the title track, their last single and also their first to miss the Top Ten. The three non-album tracks included here, a pointless rendition of "Three Times a Lady" and two rather unremarkable ballads, suggest A1 were definitely a singles band. But even though they may have not been as credible as 5ive or as consistently successful as Blue, this Greatest Hits suggests they were far more fun. Those wishing to immerse themselves in the final throes of the traditional boy band genre will find much to appreciate in this unpretentious and surprisingly eclectic collection of pop songs."

Track listing

References

A1 (band) albums
2009 greatest hits albums
2011 greatest hits albums